Heartbeat is the ninth solo studio album by Ryuichi Sakamoto, released in 1991 by Virgin Records. A second version of the album was released in the United States and Europe in 1992, which replaced the original version of "Tainai Kalki" with the David Sylvian-featuring version, "Heartbeat (Tainai Kaiki II) - Returning to the Womb", as well as English versions of "High Tide" and "Sayonara", and bonus song "Cloud #9".

Track listing

Personnel
Performers
 Ryuichi Sakamoto – keyboards, piano, lead vocals (5, 8)
 Steven Bernstein – trumpet (1, 3, 4)
 Dee Dee Brave – vocals (1, 8)
 Satoshi Tomiie – percussion (1, 3, 4, 5, 8)
 Magic Dick – harmonica
 Marco Prince – vocals (3)
 John Lurie – sax (4)
 Debra Barsha – backing vocals (4)
 Arto Lindsay – vocals (5)
 Houria Aichi – vocals (7)
 Youssou N'Dour – vocals (9)
 Bill Frisell – guitar (11, 12)
 Ingrid Chavez – vocals (11, 12)
 John Cage – voice (11)
 David Sylvian – vocals (11, 12)

Technical
 Lolly Grodner – engineer (11, 12)
 Patrick Dillett – engineer (all tracks except 12)
 Yoshifumi Iio – engineer (all tracks except 11, 12)
 Jungle DJ Towa Towa – co-producer (2)
 Axel Niehaus – assistant engineer (all tracks except 11, 12)
 Fernando Aponte – assistant engineer (all tracks except 11, 12)
 Jim Caruana – assistant engineer (11, 12)
 Koichiro Nagao – assistant engineer (all tracks except 11, 12)
 Wes Naprstek – assistant engineer (all tracks except 11, 12)

Charts

References

1991 albums
Ryuichi Sakamoto albums
Albums produced by Ryuichi Sakamoto